Note the scientist with the name Heike Kamerlingh Onnes.

Onnes in legend was one of the generals of the mythological Assyrian king Ninus.  He married Semiramis. He is said to have committed suicide, after which his widow married Ninus.

Ancient Assyrians